was a  after Kashō and before Saikō. This period spanned the years from April 851 through November 854.

Change of era
 February 5, 851 : The new era name was created to mark an event or series of events. The previous era ended and the new one commenced in Kashō 4, on the 28th day of the 4th month of 851.

Events of the Ninju era
 853 (Ninju 3, 2nd month): The emperor visited the home of udaijin Fujiwara no Yoshifusa, the grandfather of his designated heir.
 853 (Ninju 3, 5th month): Asama Shrine in Suruga Province is styled myōjin, and the shrine is accorded national ranking in the lists of shrines and temples.

Notes

References
 Aston, William George. (1896). Nihongi: Chronicles of Japan from the Earliest Times to A.D. 697. London: Kegan Paul, Trench, Trubner. OCLC 84460259 
 Brown, Delmer M. and Ichirō Ishida, eds. (1979).  Gukanshō: The Future and the Past. Berkeley: University of California Press. ;  OCLC 251325323
 Nussbaum, Louis-Frédéric and Käthe Roth. (2005).  Japan encyclopedia. Cambridge: Harvard University Press. ;  OCLC 58053128
 Ponsonby-Fane, Richard Arthur Brabazon. (1962).  Studies in Shinto and Shrines. Kyoto: Ponsonby Memorial Society. OCLC 3994492
 Titsingh, Isaac. (1834). Nihon Ōdai Ichiran; ou,  Annales des empereurs du Japon.  Paris: Royal Asiatic Society, Oriental Translation Fund of Great Britain and Ireland. OCLC 5850691
 Varley, H. Paul. (1980). A Chronicle of Gods and Sovereigns: Jinnō Shōtōki of Kitabatake Chikafusa. New York: Columbia University Press. ;  OCLC 6042764

External links 
 National Diet Library, "The Japanese Calendar" -- historical overview plus illustrative images from library's collection

Japanese eras
9th century in Japan
851 beginnings
854 endings